Laguna de Lobos is a lake located near Lobos, Buenos Aires Province in Argentina. In its shallow waters there are many pejerrey fish. Many tourists visit it, especially during the summer.

Lobos